Arizona has been the name of three ships of the United States Navy and will be the name of a future submarine. 

 , laid down in 1858 and served in the American Civil War.
 , launched in 1865 but never commissioned, was renamed Arizona in 1869. 
 , a  launched in 1915 and sunk by Japanese bombers in the attack on Pearl Harbor 7 December 1941.
 , a planned Virginia-class nuclear attack submarine.

See also
 
 , a British passenger liner and holder of the eastbound Atlantic Record in 1879
 

United States Navy ship names